The Polish Basketball Cup is the annual top-tier level national domestic basketball cup competition for clubs in Poland. It is managed and organised by the Polish Basketball League (PLK). The competition was founded in 1933. Śląsk Wrocław has won the most titles, with 14 trophies.

History
The creation of the tournament was initiated in 1933, by the Polish Association of Sports Games (PZGS), an organisation which carried out the organisation of national sports competitions in Poland.

Format
Since the 2012 season, a Final Eight format is used, in which the highest placed teams from the first half of a given Polish Basketball League (PLK) regular season qualify. Games are usually played over a four-day span in February. Additionally, the host of the tournament gains automatic qualification to the tournament.

Finals

Titles by club

 The history of Prokom Trefl Sopot stays with Asseco Gdynia.

See also
Polish League
Polish Supercup

References

External links
Polska Liga Koszykówki - Official Site 
Polish League at Eurobasket.com

 
Basketball competitions in Poland
Basketball cup competitions in Europe